Emily Baldoni (née Fuxler, born October 18, 1984) is a Swedish actress currently living in Los Angeles. Before her marriage, she was credited under the name Emily Foxler, a variant spelling of her birth name, Emily Fuxler. She is best known for her leading role in the 2013 film Coherence.

Personal life 
She is married to actor and director Justin Baldoni. In June 2015, she gave birth to their first child, a daughter. In October 2017, she gave birth to a son.

Filmography

Film

Television

References

External links

1984 births
Living people
Swedish television actresses
People from Uppsala
Swedish Bahá'ís
Swedish expatriates in the United States
Swedish film actresses
21st-century Swedish actresses